Ekachai Uekrongtham is a Thai theatre and film director. Based in Singapore, Ekachai is the founding artistic director of ACTION Theatre, a Singapore professional theatre company.

Among his stage works is Chang & Eng, a musical based on Chang and Eng Bunker, the original "Siamese twins". His other stage works include Corporate Animals - The Musical, Ka-Ra-you-OK?, Viva Viagra!, Autumn Tomyam, Mail Order Brides & Other Oriental Takeaways and Confessions of Three Unmarried Women.

He made his debut as a feature-film director in 2003 with Beautiful Boxer, a biographical drama about transsexual professional Muay Thai boxer, Nong Thoom. His second film, Pleasure Factory, about sex workers and their customers in Singapore's Geylang red-light district, was an official selection of the Cannes Film Festival in 2007. His third film, The Coffin, starring Ananda Everingham, opened in Thai theaters on August 21, 2008.

In 2014, he directed the Dolph Lundgren action drama on human trafficking Skin Trade (2015), also starring Tony Jaa and Ron Perlman, shot in Bangkok and Vancouver.

Filmography
 1991: The Nose (short film) – director, writer and producer
 2004: Beautiful Boxer – director, writer and producer
 2007: Pleasure Factory - director, writer and producer
 2008: The Coffin - director
 2009: The Wedding Game - director and writer
 2015: Skin Trade - director

Selected plays
 1995: Corporate Animals - director
 1998: Ka-Ra-you-OK? – director
 1999: The Swimming Instructor - director
 2000: Viva Viagra! - director
 2000: Chang & Eng - director
 2001: Autumn Tomyam - director
 2005: The Admiral's Odyssey - producer
 2006: Confessions of 300 Unmarried Men - producer and artistic director 
 2007: Everything But The Brain - producer and artistic director 
 2007: The Swimming Instructor - producer
 2007: Postcards from Rosa - producer and artistic director 
 2007: Hitting (On) Women - producer
 2007: Real Men, Fake Orgasms - producer
 2011: Boxing Boys - director

References

External links
 ACTION Theatre
 

Living people
Singaporean film directors
Singaporean theatre directors
Ekachai Uekrongtham
Ekachai Uekrongtham
Year of birth missing (living people)
Ekachai Uekrongtham